Ballplayer: Pelotero is a documentary film focusing on two Dominican Republic Major League Baseball prospects in 2009, Miguel Angel Sanó (nicknamed Bocatón) and Jean Carlos Batista, nicknamed Batí.

The film follows Sanó through his controversial signing period in 2009. The film is directed by Jonathan Paley, Ross Finkel and Trevor Martin, narrated by John Leguizamo, and produced by Bobby Valentine. It premiered at the Hamptons International Film Festival in 2011 and had a theatrical release in theaters in New York, Los Angeles and Minneapolis in July 2012. The film was screened from July 13–19 in Minneapolis by the Film Society of Minneapolis/St. Paul in the St. Anthony Main Theater.

References

External links 
 Rotten Tomatoes

2012 films
Documentary films about baseball